The Elliott River is a river in northern Alberta, Canada.

Elliott River has the name of Elliott Greene, a surveyor.

See also
List of rivers of Alberta

References

Rivers of Alberta